Manindra Agrawal (born 20 May 1966) is a professor at the Department of Computer Science and Engineering at the Indian Institute of Technology, Kanpur. He was the recipient of the first Infosys Prize for Mathematics, the Godel Prize in 2006; and the Shanti Swarup Bhatnagar Award in Mathematical Sciences in 2003. He has been honoured with Padma Shri in 2013.

Career
He created the AKS primality test with Neeraj Kayal and Nitin Saxena, for which he and his co-authors won the 2006 Fulkerson Prize, and the 2006 Gödel Prize. He was also awarded 2002 Clay Research Award for this work. The test is the first unconditional deterministic algorithm to test an n-digit number for primality in a time that has been proven to be polynomial in n.

In September 2008, Agrawal was chosen for the first Infosys Mathematics Prize for outstanding contributions in the broad field of mathematics. He also served on the Mathematical Sciences jury for the Infosys Prize in 2014 and 2015. He was a visiting scholar at the Institute for Advanced Study in  2003-04.

Awards and honors

 TWAS Prize (2010)

References

External links
 Homepage
 Blog report

Living people
Marwari people
1966 births
Clay Research Award recipients
Fellows of The National Academy of Sciences, India
Fellows of the Indian Academy of Sciences
Fellows of the Indian National Science Academy
Gödel Prize laureates
Indian computer scientists
IIT Kanpur alumni
Academic staff of IIT Kanpur
Institute for Advanced Study visiting scholars
Indian number theorists
People from Kanpur
Recipients of the Padma Shri in science & engineering
Scientists from Allahabad
21st-century Indian mathematicians
20th-century Indian mathematicians
TWAS laureates
Foreign associates of the National Academy of Sciences
Recipients of the Shanti Swarup Bhatnagar Award in Mathematical Science
Theoretical computer scientists